Gustav Hanson (August 8, 1934 – April 1, 2019) was an American biathlete. He competed in the 20 km individual event at the 1960 Winter Olympics.

References

1934 births
2019 deaths
American male biathletes
Olympic biathletes of the United States
Biathletes at the 1960 Winter Olympics
People from Honesdale, Pennsylvania